Dichelia clarana is a species of moth of the family Tortricidae. It is found in Australia.

External links 
Species info
 http://lepidoptera.butterflyhouse.com.au/tort/clarana.html

Tortricinae
Moths described in 1881
Taxa named by Edward Meyrick